State Route 285  (SR 285) is a state highway in White and Van Buren counties in Middle Tennessee and Bledsoe County in East Tennessee.

Route description
SR 285 begins at an intersection with US 70S in Doyle in White County. It initially runs in a southeastwardly direction, briefly merging with SR 111, where it crosses into Van Buren County, before splitting off and winding its way up the Cane Creek Valley. At the outer edges of Fall Creek Falls State Park, SR 285 joins SR 30, which approaches from Spencer to the west. Bending southeastward again, SR 285 enters Bledsoe County and crosses Bee Creek and passes Bledsoe State Forest before it has a y-intersection with SR 301, which provides access to Taft Youth Center. SR 285 then terminates at its intersection with SR 101 north of Mount Crest.

Junction list

References

External links

285
Transportation in White County, Tennessee
Transportation in Van Buren County, Tennessee
Transportation in Bledsoe County, Tennessee
Protected areas of Van Buren County, Tennessee